British–Hungarian are foreign relations between Hungary and the United Kingdom.  Hungary was a part of the Austrian Empire until 1918 when it became independent. Both countries established diplomatic relations in 1920.

History

19th century 
During the early 18th century Hungary was little-known in Britain, and its reputation was negative. That steadily changed as travellers reported on the progress in that distant land.  British observers saw Hungary as both a country and a province. However the Russian invasion of 1849 caused an outpouring of sympathy for Hungary as a victim. By 1900 British observers saw Hungary as an integral part of the Austro-Hungarian empire.

From 1848 to 1914 the status of Hungary played a minor role in British diplomacy.  London's main goal was the peaceful maintenance of the balance of power. It called for a satisfied and stable Hungary to counterbalance Russia and the Slavs residing within the Habsburg Empire. British sympathies toward Hungary did not extend to the recognition of Hungarian independence from Habsburg rule.  The Hungarian Revolution of 1848 under Lajos Kossuth gained strong support across Britain in 1848–1851. However Kossuth's calls for independence from the Austrian Empire did not become British policy. Foreign Secretary Lord Palmerston told Parliament the Britain would consider it a great misfortune to Europe if Hungary became independent. He argued that a united Austrian Empire was a European necessity and a natural ally of Britain.
Liberal reformers in Hungary closely watched Britain as a model for the sort of parliamentary government they were seeking. They were especially attracted to the British free-trade movement. They outwitted reactionary censorship. Under the pretext of criticizing British conditions, they agitated in favour of a change in feudal Hungary.

20th century 
In 1924 the Bank of England reached agreement with the Royal Hungarian Note Institution. Britain financed Hungary's reconstruction and re-entry into European commerce. This  represented a major expansion of the foreign relations of both nations, and was part of a British effort to forestall inroads into Europe from New York banks.

During WWII, UK didn't declare war on Hungary until 5 December 1941.

On 2-4 February 1984, Prime Minister Margaret Thatcher visited Hungary, in her first official visit to the Eastern Bloc. She met with Prime Minister György Lázár and First Secretary János Kádár, but their meeting was cancelled at the last minute. She also laid a wreath at Hősök tere and the Commonwealth War Cemetery in Solymár.

Resident diplomatic missions
 Hungary has an embassy in London and a consulate-general in Manchester.
 United Kingdom has an embassy in Budapest.

See also  
 Foreign relations of Hungary
 Foreign relations of the United Kingdom
 United Kingdom–European Union relations
 Hungarian migration to the United Kingdom

Notes

Further reading
 Bán, András. Hungarian-British Diplomacy, 1938-1941: The Attempt to Maintain Relations (Psychology Press, 2004).
  Bátonyi, Gábor. Britain & Central Europe, 1918-1933 (1999)  240pp
 Bridge F. R. Great Britain and Austria-Hungary 1906-14 (1972).
 Evans, R. J. W. "Hungary in the Habsburg Monarchy in the nineteenth century: The British dimension." Hungarian Quarterly 44.171 (2003) pp  p111-121.
 Frank, Tibor. Picturing Austria-Hungary: The British Perception of the Habsburg Monarchy 1865-1870 (2006)

 Haraszti, É. H. "Contemporary Hungarian Reactions to the Anti-Corn Law Movement." Acta Historica Academiae Scientiarum Hungaricae 8.3/4 (1961): 381-403 online.
 Haraszti, Éva H. "British Reflections on the Decisive Year of Post-War Hungary: 1948." Acta Historica Academiae Scientiarum Hungaricae 27.1/2 (1981): 189-204 online.
 Jeszenszky, G. "The Hungarian Question in British-Politics, 1848-1914." New Hungarian Quarterly 26#100 (1985): 162–170.
 Laszlo, Peter, and Martyn Rady, British-Hungarian Relations Since 1848 (2004), 366pp.
 Macartney, C. A. Hungary, a Short History (1962) online
  Max, Stanley M. United States, Great Britain & the Sovietization of Hungary, 1945-48 (1985),  195pp.
 Meszerics, Tamás. "Undermine, or bring them over: SOE and OSS plans for Hungary in 1943." Journal of Contemporary History 43.2 (2008): 195–216. SOE was British and OSS was American; they barely cooperated. online
 Péteri, György. "'Tying up a Loose End' British Foreign Economic Strategy in 1924: The Hungarian Stabilization." Acta Historica Academiae Scientiarum Hungaricae 30#3/4 (1984): 321–351. online
 Szenczi, N. J. "British Influences on Hungarian Literature" Slavonic and East European Review 24#63 (1946), pp. 172-179 online
 Urbán, Aladár. "Attempts at reform and the lessons of history: constitutional models and the beginnings of political journalism in feudal Hungary, 1841-1842" Etudes Historiques Hongroises (1980) 151#1, pp 463–492.

External links 
British Foreign and Commonwealth Office about the relation with Hungary 
British embassy in Budapest
 Hungarian embassy in London 

 
United Kingdom 
Bilateral relations of the United Kingdom